Cataprosopus is a genus of the snout moth. It was described by Arthur Gardiner Butler in 1881 and is known from India, China, and Japan.

Species
 Cataprosopus chalybopicta (Warren, 1896)
 Cataprosopus chapalis (de Joannis, 1929)
 Cataprosopus melli (Caradja & Meyrick, 1933)
 Cataprosopus monstrosus Butler, 1881

References

Megarthridiini
Pyralidae genera